This is a consolidated list of castles and palaces in Denmark.  The Danish word slot , like the word schloss in the related Germanic language— modern German— can mean either castle, a Country house or palace, in accordance with common English usage.

Whenever possible traditional English translations provided by the Danish Palaces and Properties Agency, a national agency maintaining and utilising the states palaces, castles and gardens, have been used to determine whether a property should be called a castle or a palace.  When not possible the following guidelines, which are in general keeping with the above translations, and with Wikipedia articles have been used:
 Castle: Generally older building, generally a fortified building
 Palace: Generally newer building, generally a non-fortified building used primarily as a residence

Other related words 
The Danish word borg, which appears at the end of many castle and palace names literally means "fortified castle", but it is no clear indication that the property is indeed fortified.  For example, Amalienborg is translated as Amalienborg Palace.

The Danish word palæ translates to "mansion", and is most often used as an indication of a non-royal, urban mansion.  Exceptions are the four palæer (plural) at Amalienborg Palace, the four individual buildings that make up the Amalienborg Palace complex.  These were originally non-royal, urban mansions, which were taken over by royalty in the late 18th century.

List of castles and palaces

A-D 
Absalon's Castle - ruins
Aldershvile Palace - ruins
Amalienborg Palace
Antvorskov Castle - ruins
Arreskov Castle
Arresødal Castle
Asdal Castle - ruins
Asserbo Castle - ruins
Augustenborg Palace
Bastruptårnet - ruins
Berritzgaard Palace
Bernstorff Palace and Palace Gardens
Bispens Hald - ruins
Boller Castle (Horsens)
Borgvold - ruins
Borrebjerg - ruins
Brattingborg - ruins
Brundlund Castle
Borgeby Castle
Bygholm - ruins
Charlottenborg Palace
Charlottenlund Palace and Palace Gardens
Christiansborg Palace (1st)
Christiansborg Palace (2nd)
Christiansborg Palace
Clausholm Castle
Copenhagen Castle
Dannebrog, The Royal Yacht
Dragsholm Castle
Dronningholm Castle - ruins
Dronninglund Castle
Duborg Castle
Dynæsvold - ruins

E-G 
 Egelund Castle
 Egeskov Castle
 Egholm Palace
 Elverhøj - ruins
 Engelsborg - ruins
 Engelsholm Castle
 Eremitage Palace Hunting Lodge
 Eriksholm Castle
 Eriksvolde - ruins
 Fredensborg Palace and Palace Gardens
 Frederiksberg Palace, Frederiksberg Palace Gardens and Søndermarken
 Frederiksborg Palace and Castle Gardens
 Frijsenborg
 Fuglsang Manor
 Fussingø Palace
 Fyrbakken (Hjelm) - ruins
 Gamleborg (Bornholm) - ruins
 Gammel Brattingborg - ruins
 Gammel Estrup Manor
 Gammel Avernæs slot
 Gammel Vraa Castle
 Gavnø Castle
 Gisselfeld
 Gjorslev
 Glorup Manor
 Gram Castle
 Grimstrup - ruins
 Gyldensteen slot 
 Gråsten Palace and Palace Gardens
 Gråsten Skanse (Ærø) - ruins
 Guldborg Banke - ruins
 Gurre Castle - ruins

H-K 
Haderslevhus Castle
Hagenskov Castle
Hagsholm - ruins
Hald castle - ruins
Hammershus Castle - ruins
Haraldsborg - ruins
Harritslevgård
Hesselagergård Manor
Hindsgavl Castle
Hirschholm Palace - historic
Holbæk Castle
Holckenhavn Castle
Holsteinborg Castle
Hvedholm Castle
Hvidkilde Castle
Hvidøre
Højriis Castle
Hønborg - ruins
Jungshoved - ruins
Jægerspris Castle
Kalø Castle - ruins
Kalundborg Castle
Klintholm slot
Knabstrup Manor
Kokkedal Castle (Zealand)
Kokkedal Castle (Jutland)
Koldinghus Castle
Kongstedlund
Korsør Castle
Krengerup Manor
Kronborg Castle 
Kærstrup

L-S 
Langesø Castle
Ledreborg Palace
Lerchenborg
Lilleborg, Bornholm - ruins
Liselund old Castle
Liselund Palace
Lykkesholm Castle
Malling Church - ruins
Marienlyst Palace
Marselisborg Palace
Meilgaard Castle
Nebbe Voldsted - ruins
Niels Bugges Hald - ruins
Nordborg Castle
Nyborg Castle
Nykøbing Castle
Nysø Manor
Næsbyhoved - ruins
Næsholm - ruins
Næsseslottet
Nørlund slot
Nørre Vosborg
Nørreris Castle - ruins
Nørtorp - ruins
Odense Castle
Pederstrup
Rane Ladegård - ruins
Ravnsborg - ruins
Refshale Castle - ruins
Riberhus - ruins
Rønninge Søgård
Rosenborg Castle and Castle Gardens
Rosenholm Castle
Roskilde Palace
Saint Albert Castle - ruins
Sandbjerg Estate
Schackenborg Castle
Selsø
Silkeborg slot
Skanderborg Palace
Skjoldnæsholm - manor
Skovgård Castle - ruins
Skrøbelev Gods
Sophienberg Palace and Palace Gardens
Sorgenfri Palace
Sorø Abbey
Sostrup Castle
Sprogø - ruins
Spøttrup Castle
Søborg Castle - ruins
Søby Volde - ruins
Søllerød Slot
Sønderborg Castle

T-Aa 
Tirsbæk Palace
Tranekær Castle
Tønderhus - historic
Tårnborg Castle - ruins near Korsør
Tårupgård Castle
Ulstrup Castle
Valgestrup - ruins
Valdemars Castle
Vallø Castle
Vardehus - ruins
Vesborg Castle - ruins
Voergård Castle
Vordingborg Castle
Yellow Palace
Ørkild Castle - ruins
Aalborghus Castle
Ålevad - ruins
Aalholm Castle

See also 
List of Danish royal residences
List of historic houses in Denmark
List of historic houses in metropolitan Copenhagen

External links 
 
 
 
 
 Palaces and Properties Agency
 Castles and manor houses by Danish region

 
 
Denmark
Lists of buildings and structures in Denmark
Denmark
Denmark
Castles and palaces